Operation Fiela (which means ‘sweep’ in Sesotho) is an ongoing joint operation by the South African Police Service (SAPS) and includes some other departments of the government. The South African National Defence Force (SANDF) was also involved in the first few months. Among others, this operation is mainly aimed at ridding the country of illegal weapons, drug dens, prostitution rings and other illegal activities in the country.

History 
Operation Fiela was initially launched after a series of xenophobic attacks in the province of Kwazulu-Natal and some parts of Gauteng province. The South African National Defence Force was involved in a support role during the first three months of the operation, from 21 April to 30 June 2015.

References

Law enforcement in South Africa